Gol Heydar (also Romanized as Gol Ḩeydar; also known as Gorgeh Dar and Gorg Ḩeydar) is a village in Gamasiyab Rural District, in the Central District of Nahavand County, Hamadan Province, Iran. At the 2006 census, its population was 680, in 170 families.

References 

Populated places in Nahavand County